Philip Shelby (12 July 1950 - 18 December 2019) was an American writer, possibly best known for writing the second novel, The Cassandra Compact, in the Covert-One series in conjunction with fellow author Robert Ludlum.

Credits
 This Far from Paradise (1988)
 The Tides (1989)
 Dream Weavers (1991)
 Oasis of Dreams (1992)
 Days of Drums (1996)
 Last Rights (1997)
 Gatekeeper (1998)
 The Cassandra Compact (2001)
 By Dawn's Early Light (2002)
Survivor (2015)
Mechanic: Resurrection (2016) (screenplay)

References

External links
 Fantastic Fiction - Philip Shelby biography

Living people
American male writers
1950 births